Pieter Theodoor "Theo" ten Caat (born 8 December 1964) is a former Dutch professional football forward who played for FC Twente, BV Veendam, FC Groningen, Aberdeen and Vitesse Arnhem.

Club career
After nearly 200 matches in the Dutch league, Ten Caat moved abroad to play for Scottish side Aberdeen in 1991.

In 1999, Ten Caat returned to former club Veendam.

Managerial career
Since summer 2016, Ten Caat works for the FC Twente youth academy and was coach at amateur sides WHC and Achilles '94.

References

External links
AFC Heritage profile

1964 births
Living people
People from Hoogeveen
Association football forwards
Dutch footballers
Eredivisie players
Eerste Divisie players
Scottish Football League players
FC Twente players
SC Veendam players
FC Groningen players
Aberdeen F.C. players
SBV Vitesse players
Dutch expatriate footballers
Expatriate footballers in Scotland
Vv Hoogeveen players
Dutch expatriate sportspeople in Scotland
Footballers from Drenthe